Strid, originally known as Malfeitor from 1991 to 1992, is a Norwegian black metal band commonly recognized as a major pioneer within the depressive black metal scene.

History

After releasing two demos, "Malfeitor" in 1991 and "Pandemonium" in 1992, Malfeitor changed its name to Battle and underwent several lineup changes. In 1992, Battle recorded its demo "End of Life," which contained only one song and spanned roughly 11 minutes. Its lineup then consisted of Espen 'Storm' Andersen on bass and vocals, Lars Fredrik Bergstrøm on guitars, and Jardar on drums. The band again renamed itself in 1993 to Strid, Norwegian for "strife." That year, Strid released "End of Life" under its new name through the German label "Malicious Records". Lars Fredrik Bergstrøm departed afterward and was replaced by Ravn Harjar. From 1993 to 1994, the band wrote and recorded a self-titled EP, which was released through Malicious Records and contained only two songs: "Det hviskes blant sorte vinder" and "Nattevandring." This demo featured a more ambient sound, earning the band recognition as one of depressive black metal's first pioneers.

Since then, the band released no more official records until 2007, but numerous bootlegs of the band's material were released by publishers such as Ars Mysteriorum in a CD and LP in 2005, each featuring tracks from both "End of Life" and the eponymous EP. Founding member Espen 'Storm' Andersen committed suicide in 2001. Strid officially re-released all of its old material, including that which it released as Malfeitor, in a second eponymous record through  Greek label Kyrck Productions & Armour in 2007. The band reunited at some point between 2009 and 2010, featuring Vicotnik (Dødheimsgard, ex-Aphrodisiac, ex-Ved Buens Ende, ex-Manes, ex-Code, ex-Naer Mataron, ex-Endwarfment) and Lars Fredrik Bergstrøm (the main composer of the "End of Life" track). Bergstrøm died in 2014 - by then the band was composed of Ravn Harjar on guitars and vocals, Vicotnik on bass, and Sigmund (ex-Inflabitan, ex-Dødheimsgard) on guitars. Citing Bergstrøm's death and internal conflict, Harjar announced the dissolution of Strid on its official facebook page in January 2015.

Members

Final lineup
 Vicotnik – bass
 Ravn Harjar – guitars and vocals
 Sigmund - guitars

Former members
 Espen 'Storm' Andersen (deceased 2001) – bass, vocals
 Jardar – drums
 Lars Fredrik Bergstrøm (deceased 2014) – guitars

Discography
 Malfeitor (1991, self-released, demo)
 Pandemonium (1992, self-released, demo)
 End of Life (1993, self-released, demo)
 Strid (1994, Malicious Records, EP)
 Strid (2007, Kyrck Productions & Armour, compilation)

References

External links
 Strid on Metal-Archives.com
 Malfeitor on Metal-Archives.com
 Strid on facebook

Norwegian black metal musical groups
Musical groups established in 1991
1991 establishments in Norway